The Weekender was a free weekly newspaper covering Torbay and South Devon, published by the Westcountry Publications. The paper was published in two editions; the Torbay edition covered Torquay, Paignton, and Brixham, while the Newton & Teignbridge edition covered Newton Abbot and Kingsteignton.

Newspapers published in Devon
Publications established in 1981
1981 establishments in England